The Primera División of Costa Rica, commonly known as Fútbol de Primera División (FPD), and Liga Promerica for sponsorship reasons, is the top professional association football division in Costa Rica. It is administered by the Unión de Clubes de Fútbol de la Primera División (UNAFUT). The league consists of 12 teams, with the last-placed team relegated to the Liga de Ascenso.

The league was founded in 1921, with Herediano crowned as the first champions. Saprissa is the most successful club having won the championship a record 37 times. Together with Alajuelense (30 titles) and Herediano (29 titles), they have dominated the league.

Competition format
The Liga FPD features a format in which two separate tournaments are held over the course of one particular season. The Torneo de Apertura (Spanish for "Opening Tournament") lasts from July to December, while the Torneo de Clausura (Spanish for "Closing Tournament") lasts from January to May. From 2007 to 2017, these were known respectively as Torneo de Invierno ("Winter Tournament") and Torneo de Verano ("Summer Tournament"), based on the Costa Rican seasons, with the Invierno tournament played during the rainy season and the Verano tournament played during the dry season.

A separate tournament is played on stages. The first stage follows the usual double round-robin format. During the course of a tournament, each club plays every other club twice, once at home and once away, for a total of 22 matchdays. Teams receive three points for a win, one point for a draw, and no points for a loss. Teams are ranked by total points, with the top-four clubs at the end of the stage qualifying to the second stage. The second stage consists of a quadrangular in which the best four teams qualified will face each other twice again, adding 6 additional matchdays. If the top team of the first stage also wins the quadrangular, the club will be crowned as champions; otherwise, a double-legged final will be played between the winners of the first stage and the winners of the quadrangular to determine the champion.

Promotion and relegation
A system of promotion and relegation exists between the Primera División and the Segunda División. In spite of having two champions during a regular season, the Liga FPD only relegates one team per season based on the aggregate performance in both Apertura and Clausura tournaments. The last-placed team in the aggregate table is relegated to the Liga de Ascenso.

Qualifying for CONCACAF competitions

The top teams in the Liga FPD qualify to the CONCACAF Champions League. Starting in the 2017–18 season, the CONCACAF Champions League will be separated into two stages. The first stage is CONCACAF League, which consists of sixteen teams from Central America and the Caribbean, in which the winner qualifies to the second stage, the Champions League, joining other fifteen teams. Because of this format, the qualification criteria in the Liga FPD are:
If one team wins both the Apertura and Clausura tournaments
The double champion will qualify directly to the second stage of the Champions League
The two non-champion teams with the best aggregate record at the end of the season will qualify to the CONCACAF League
If two teams are crowned champions over the season
The champion with the best aggregate record will qualify directly to the second stage of the Champions League
The champion with the worst aggregate record will qualify to the CONCACAF League
The non-champion team with the best aggregate record will qualify to the CONCACAF League

History

On 13 June 1921, the Costa Rican Football Federation was created. With its creation, the need of a tournament also emerged, along with the establishment of a national team, as a result of Costa Rica being invited to the 1921 Juegos del Centenario in Guatemala.

The first season of the Costa Rican Primera División was played in 1921 with seven teams: Alajuelense, Cartaginés, Herediano, La Libertad, Sociedad Gimnástica Española, Sociedad Gimnástica Limonense and La Unión de Tres Ríos. La Libertad and Gimnástica Limonense played the first ever match of the Liga FPD, with La Libertad emerging victorious with a lone goal scored by Rafael Madrigal. Herediano were crowned as champions.

In 1999, the Costa Rican Football Federation created the UNAFUT (acronym of Unión de Clubes de Fútbol de la Primera División), an entity designed for the organization and administration of the Primera División tournament and its youth leagues (known as Alto Rendimiento).

On 9 January 2014, UNAFUT decided to rename the tournament to Liga FPD, in order to give more identity to the league.

The main rivalry in the league is El Clásico, played by Alajuelense and Saprissa, as both teams are the most successful in the league and both share the vast majority of followers throughout the country. Since their first encounter at the old national stadium on 12 October 1949, the two teams have faced each other in over 300 matches, with the winning balance in favor of Saprissa.

Clubs 2022–23

Champions

Performance by club

Player records

Top scorers

Most appearances

References

External links
 UNAFUT - Primera División de Costa Rica
 Federación Costarricense de Fútbol (Football Federation of Costa Rica)
 Costa Rica - List of Champions and Runners Up, RSSSF.com
Primera División summary(SOCCERWAY)

 
1
Top level football leagues in Central America